Merlin, in comics, may refer to:

 Merlin (DC Comics), the DC Comics version of the Arthurian wizard
 Merlyn (DC Comics), a DC Comics supervillain and arch-rival of Green Arrow
 Merlin the Magician (comics), a Quality Comics superhero character, a descendant of the Arthurian wizard
 Merlyn (Marvel Comics), a supporting character of Marvel Comics' Captain Britain
 Merlin (Marvel Comics), the name of several characters in Marvel Comics
 Maha Yogi, a Marvel Comics character who impersonated the Merlin of Camelot and also went by the name of "Mad Merlin"

See also
Merlin (disambiguation)